The Bolivian earthcreeper (Tarphonomus harterti) is a species of bird in the family Furnariidae. It is endemic to Bolivia. Its natural habitat is subtropical or tropical high-altitude shrubland.

References

 SACC (2007). Recognize the genus Tarphonomus for two "Upucerthia". Accessed 2008-10-28.

External links
Image at ADW

Birds of Bolivia
Tarphonomus
Endemic birds of Bolivia
Birds described in 1892
Taxonomy articles created by Polbot